40 The Shambles is an historic building in the English city of York, North Yorkshire. Grade II listed, part of the structure dates to the early 18th century, with an alteration and shopfront added in the early and mid 19th century.

References 

40
Houses in North Yorkshire
Buildings and structures in North Yorkshire
18th-century establishments in England
Grade II listed buildings in York
Grade II listed houses
18th century in York